The 2010 BWF Super Series Finals was a top level badminton competition which was held from January 5, 2011 to January 9, 2011 in New Taipei City, Taiwan. The final was held by Chinese Taipei Badminton Association and sponsored by VICTOR. It was the final event of the BWF Super Series competition on the 2010 BWF Super Series schedule. The total purse for the event was $500,000.

Representatives by nation

§: Petya Nedelcheva from Bulgaria was the only player who played in two categories (women's singles and women's doubles), Zhang Nan from China and Ko Sung-hyun from Korea were the players who played in two categories (men's doubles and mixed doubles), while Zhao Yunlei from China and Kunchala Voravichitchaikul from Thailand were the players who played in two categories (women's doubles and mixed doubles).

Performance by nation

Men's singles

Seeding
 Lee Chong Wei
 Chen Long
 Boonsak Ponsana
 Peter Gade

Group A

Group B

Finals

Women's singles

Seeding
 Wang Shixian
 Wang Yihan
 Bae Youn-joo
 Tine Baun

Group A

Group B

Finals

Men's doubles

Seeding
 Carsten Mogensen/ Mathias Boe
 Ko Sung-hyun/ Yoo Yeon-seong
 Jung Jae-sung/ Lee Yong-dae
 Tan Boon Heong/ Koo Kien Keat

Group A

Group B

Finals

Women's doubles

Seeding
 Cheng Wen-hsing/ Chien Yu-chin
 Cheng Shu/ Zhao Yunlei
 Anastasia Russkikh/ Petya Nedelcheva
 Duanganong Aroonkesorn/ Kunchala Voravichitchaikul

Group A

Group B

Finals

Mixed doubles

Seeding
 Thomas Laybourn/ Kamilla Rytter Juhl
 Sudket Prapakamol/ Saralee Thungthongkam
 Robert Mateusiak/ Nadieżda Kostiuczyk
 Zhang Nan/ Zhao Yunlei

Group A

Group B

Finals

See also
 List of sporting events in Taiwan

References

External links
BWF Super Series Masters Finals 2010 at tournamentsoftware.com

BWF Super Series Masters Finals
BWF Super Series Masters Finals
Masters Finals
Badminton tournaments in Taiwan
BWF Super Series Finals